Ampelita soulaiana is a species of tropical air-breathing land snail, a terrestrial pulmonate gastropod mollusk in the family Acavidae.

Distribution
This species is endemic to Madagascar.

References

Acavidae
Molluscs of Madagascar
Gastropods described in 1973
Taxonomy articles created by Polbot